Philipp Knechtel (born 28 June 1996) is a German footballer who plays as a centre back for NOFV-Oberliga Nord club VfB Krieschow.

Career

Club career
On 3 January 2020, Knechtel joined NOFV-Oberliga Süd club VfB 1921 Krieschow. Beside that, he was also working as an U17 assistant coach at his former club, FC Energie Cottbus.

References

External links
 Philipp Knechtel at FuPa.net
 

1996 births
Living people
People from Bernburg
Footballers from Saxony-Anhalt
German footballers
Association football defenders
FC Energie Cottbus players
VfB Germania Halberstadt players
3. Liga players
Regionalliga players
Oberliga (football) players